Sunder Lamont Nix (born December 2, 1961, in Birmingham, Alabama) was a 1984 Summer Olympics gold medalist in the men's 4x400 meter relay for the United States.

In 2013 competed at the Masters National Outdoor Track & Field Championship.

References

 

1961 births
Track and field athletes from Birmingham, Alabama
American male sprinters
Athletes (track and field) at the 1984 Summer Olympics
Olympic gold medalists for the United States in track and field
Living people
World Athletics Championships medalists
World Athletics Championships athletes for the United States
Medalists at the 1984 Summer Olympics
Universiade medalists in athletics (track and field)
Universiade gold medalists for the United States
Medalists at the 1983 Summer Universiade
Big Ten Athlete of the Year winners
Indiana Hoosiers men's track and field athletes